BQN or bqn may refer to:

 BQN, the IATA and FAA LID code for Rafael Hernández Airport, Aguadilla, Puerto Rico
 bqn, the ISO 639-3 code for Bulgarian Sign Language, Bulgaria
 BQN, an array programming language